The Fang Brothers, Fang Bi and Fang Xiang, are two palace guards under Shang Dynasty featured within the famed classic Chinese novel Investiture of the Gods (more commonly known as Fengshen Yanyi).

At one point in time, following the cruel death of Queen Jiang, every high-ranking official would discuss matters with Huang Feihu -- the Fang Brothers being included. Soon enough, the brothers would spout the words, "King Zhou is vicious and mindless. He killed his queen, and now he wants to kill his two sons! We are rebelling! We the brothers are taking these two princes to East Lu State to seek help." Thus, the two brothers charged through the gates each with a prince under their arms; with their great brute strength, no one was able to stop them. Once Huang Feihu attained the Dragon-Phoenix Sword to supposedly subdue the Fang Brothers, he would instead meet up with them and plan their resolved route. Soon enough, it had been decided that Fang Xiang would go to the Grand Duke of the South and ask for troops to avenge the death of the queen, while Fang Bi brought the two young princes to the Grand Duke of the East. Following the success of these tasks, the Fang Brothers would leave in tears and did not appear again.

References

 Investiture of the Gods chapter 8

Investiture of the Gods characters